Seth Bullock (July 23, 1849 – September 23, 1919) was a Canadian American frontiersman, business proprietor, politician, sheriff, and U.S. Marshal. He was a prominent citizen in Deadwood, South Dakota, where he lived from 1876 until his death, operating a hardware store and later a large hotel, the Bullock Hotel.

Early life
Many of the details of Bullock's early life are lost. He was born in Amherstburg, Canada West (now Ontario) on the Canadian side of the Detroit River.

His father, retired British Army Sergeant Major and hero George Bullock, was known to be active in the politics of Sandwich, Ontario (amalgamated in 1935 into the City of  Windsor). He has been mistakenly believed to be related to British General Sir George Bullock, who was actually younger than Seth. Seth's mother was a Scotswoman born Agnes Findley.

By 1860, Bullock's father, George Bullock, was forced to resign his position as County Treasurer due to missing funds. To avoid prosecution in Canada, Bullock's father fled across the border to Detroit, Michigan, leaving his eight children alone in Sandwich. Bullock's mother had died during this time, so the children were left to take care of themselves. The property owned by Bullock's father in Sandwich was either seized by his creditors or sold at public auction in 1863, as he had defaulted on his mortgage and other debt obligations.

Bullock's childhood was not a happy one. His father was a strict disciplinarian, known to beat young Seth for minor infractions. Bullock ran away first at age 13, then again at age 16 to Montana to live temporarily with his older sister, Jessie Bullock. By age 18, he had permanently left home.

Helena
In 1867, Bullock became a resident of Helena, Montana, where he unsuccessfully ran for the Territorial Legislature. He was subsequently elected as a Republican to the Territorial Senate, served in 1871 and 1872, and helped create Yellowstone National Park. 

In 1873, he was elected sheriff of Lewis and Clark County, Montana. During his tenure as sheriff, he killed his first man, Clell Watson. Watson had stolen a horse and engaged in a gunfight with Bullock, in which Bullock was slightly wounded in the shoulder. Watson was then taken into custody. 

Watson was prepared to be hanged, but a mob appeared and scared off the executioner. Bullock climbed the scaffold and pulled the lever, sending Watson to his death. Bullock then held off the mob with a shotgun. This incident was recreated in the pilot episode of HBO's television series Deadwood, except in the show Watson was hanged on the front step of the sheriff's office.

Soon after this event, Bullock and Sol Star opened a hardware store. In August 1876, they decided that an untapped market for hardware existed in the gold rush town of Deadwood, in the Dakota Territory. The two purchased a lot in Deadwood and set up shop there as the "Office of Star and Bullock, Auctioneers and Commission Merchants," first in a tent and then a building.

Deadwood, South Dakota

Deadwood was a lawless, rowdy camp. Two days before Bullock and Star’s arrival, Wild Bill Hickok was murdered by Jack McCall. McCall shot Hickok in the back of the head while he sat playing poker. McCall was later found not guilty by an impromptu camp court and released, after which he promptly left town. (McCall was later re-tried, found guilty, and executed.) The demand for law enforcement grew following Hickok's murder and Bullock's background made him the logical choice for Deadwood's first sheriff. However, he was not elected to the position, but rather was appointed by then-Governor Pennington of Dakota Territory in March 1877. In November 1877, a special election was held in Lawrence County, where Deadwood was located. Bullock was the candidate for sheriff on the Peoples Party (Republican) ticket, and John J. Manning was the candidate for the Democratic Party. Manning won the election, thereby becoming the first elected sheriff for Lawrence County of which the main city was Deadwood. Bullock's tenure as appointed sheriff lasted approximately nine months. In 1878, Bullock again ran for sheriff of Lawrence County on the Republican ticket, and faced incumbent John Manning. As was the case in 1877, Manning won the election against Bullock and was awarded a two-year term as sheriff.

During his tenure as the appointed sheriff, Bullock took his job seriously, deputizing several residents and tackling the job of civilizing the camp. Despite (or perhaps because of) a reputation for fearlessness and an uncompromising nature, Bullock managed the task without killing anyone. Bullock had several 'run-ins' with Al Swearengen, proprietor of the notorious Gem Theater, Deadwood's most notable brothel. Swearengen had a knack for making money from vice and shrewdly invested some of his profits in cultivating alliances with the camp's wealthy and powerful.

Bullock was appointed Marshal in 1905 by President Theodore Roosevelt and again in 1909 by President William Howard Taft. When appointed sheriff, one of Bullock's first duties was to confront Dodge City Deputy Marshal Wyatt Earp, who was possibly interested in the sheriff's job. Bullock told Earp that his services were not needed. A week later, Earp left Deadwood to return to Dodge City.

Having attained some stability in Deadwood, Bullock brought his wife Martha Eccles Bullock and daughter, Margaret, to town from her parents' home in Michigan, where they had been living during this period. They subsequently had another daughter, Florence, and a son, Stanley.

Bullock and Star purchased a ranch where Redwater Creek met the Belle Fourche River and dubbed it the S&B Ranch Company. Bullock is also credited with introducing alfalfa farming to South Dakota in 1881. Later, he became a deputy U.S. Marshal, partnered with Star and Harris Franklin in the Deadwood Flouring Mill, and invested in mining, the local growth industry. Bullock and Star eventually expanded their business interests to the towns of Spearfish, Sturgis, and Custer.

Bullock, then a deputy sheriff from Medora, North Dakota, met Theodore Roosevelt in 1884 while bringing a horse thief known as Crazy Steve into custody on the range, near what would become the town of Belle Fourche. The two became lifelong friends, Roosevelt later saying of Bullock, "Seth Bullock is a true Westerner, the finest type of frontiersman."

Belle Fourche and the Bullock Hotel

Bullock and Star contributed further to the economic development of the region by convincing the Fremont, Elkhorn, and Missouri Valley Railroad to build a track by offering them 40 acres (16 ha) of free right-of-way across their land when a speculator purchased the right of way to Minnesela and demanded a high price from the railroad. The railroad built a station three miles (5 km) northwest of Minnesela in 1890, and Bullock and Star were instrumental in founding the town of Belle Fourche, offering free lots to anyone moving from Minnesela. Belle Fourche became the largest railhead for livestock in the United States and the county seat was changed from Minnesela to Belle Fourche.

Bullock and Star's hardware store in Deadwood burned down in 1894. Rather than rebuild, they built Deadwood's first hotel on the site—a three-story, 63-room luxury hotel. The Bullock Hotel continues to operate to this day, now incorporating a casino.

Later life and death

Bullock's friendship with Roosevelt led to his becoming a captain of Troop A in Grigsby's Cowboy Regiment. This was another volunteer cavalry regiment that Congress authorized in the spring of 1898. It was similar in composition to Theodore Roosevelt's Rough Riders, which saw action in Cuba during the Spanish–American War. Although Troop A never left training camp in Louisiana before the war ended, Bullock earned the rank of captain. When Roosevelt became vice president under President William McKinley, he appointed Bullock as the first forest supervisor of the Black Hills Reserve. After Roosevelt was elected president, Bullock organized 50 people (including Tom Mix) to ride in the inaugural parade in 1905. Bullock was then appointed U.S. Marshal for South Dakota for the next nine years. Roosevelt later selected Bullock as one of 18 officers (others included Frederick Russell Burnham, James R. Garfield, and John M. Parker) to raise a volunteer infantry division, Roosevelt's World War I volunteers, for service in France in 1917.

Congress gave Roosevelt the authority to raise up to four divisions similar to the Rough Riders; however, as commander-in-chief, President Woodrow Wilson refused to use the volunteers and the unit was disbanded. After Roosevelt's death in January 1919, Bullock created a monument to him with the aid of the Black Hill Pioneers, dedicated on July 4, 1919, on Sheep Mountain, which was renamed Mount Roosevelt.

Bullock died of colon cancer shortly thereafter, on September 23, 1919, at his home at 28 Van Buren Street in Deadwood. He is buried in Mount Moriah Cemetery in Deadwood, along with Wild Bill Hickok and Calamity Jane, with his grave facing Mount Roosevelt. Bullock's grave is more than 750 feet away from the main cemetery grounds.

In popular culture
Bullock was portrayed by Timothy Olyphant in HBO's critically acclaimed TV series Deadwood (2004–2006). Olyphant reprised the role for the HBO sequel Deadwood: The Movie (2019).

References

External links
Seth Bullock Biography, Black Hills Visitor magazine
Seth Bullock - Finest Type of Frontiersman, Legends of America (travel site)

1849 births
1919 deaths
Canadian people of English descent
Canadian people of Scottish descent
People from Amherstburg, Ontario
United States Marshals
Lawmen of the American Old West
People from Helena, Montana
Members of the Montana Territorial Legislature
Montana sheriffs
Pre-Confederation Canadian emigrants to the United States
People from Deadwood, South Dakota
Montana Republicans
South Dakota Republicans
American military personnel of the Spanish–American War
Military personnel from South Dakota
Deaths from cancer in South Dakota
Deaths from colorectal cancer
Theodore Roosevelt
People from Billings County, North Dakota